Walter Monslow, Baron Monslow (26 January 1895 – 12 October 1966) was a Labour Party politician in the United Kingdom.

Born in Wrexham, Monslow joined the Associated Society of Locomotive Engineers and Firemen, becoming its organising secretary.  He also joined the Labour Party, serving on Wrexham Rural District Council for some years until 1937.

At the 1935 general election, Monslow unsuccessfully contested Newcastle upon Tyne Central.  He was elected at 1945 general election as Member of Parliament (MP) for Barrow-in-Furness, and held the seat until he retired from the House of Commons at the general election in March 1966.

On 15 June 1966, he was made a life peer as Baron Monslow, of Barrow-in-Furness in the County Palatine of Lancaster. He died in October that year, aged 71.

References

External links 
 

 

1895 births
1966 deaths
Associated Society of Locomotive Engineers and Firemen-sponsored MPs
Labour Party (UK) MPs for English constituencies
UK MPs 1945–1950
UK MPs 1950–1951
UK MPs 1951–1955
UK MPs 1955–1959
UK MPs 1959–1964
UK MPs 1964–1966
UK MPs who were granted peerages
Life peers created by Elizabeth II
Labour Party (UK) life peers